Krohnittidae is a family of chaetognaths in the order Aphragmophora. It consists of a single genus, Krohnitta von Ritter-Záhony, 1910.

Species
Krohnitta balagopali Nair, Panampunnayil, Pillai & Gireesh, 2008
Krohnitta pacifica (Aida, 1897)
Krohnitta subtilis (Grassi, 1881)

References

Chaetognatha
Protostome genera